Nikolai Vladimirovich Mefodiev (1869, Tunguda, Arkhangelsk Governorate — after 1927) was a medical doctor, village teacher and deputy of the Third Imperial Duma from the Arkhangelsk Governorate between 1907 and 1912. After the end of the deputy term, he continued publishing a newspaper — a business that he had started back in 1909. After the February Revolution he sent a greeting to the Duma; after the October Revolution he returned to medical practice. In 1918, he joined the anti-Bolshevik administration of the Northern Oblast (chaired by Nikolai Tchaikovsky). March 24, 1920 Mefodiev was arrested by the bolshevik government and sentenced to two years of penal labour. In June 1927, he was arrested again and exiled to Siberia, where all his tracks were lost.

Literature 
 Мефодиев Николай Владимирович (in Russian) // Государственная дума Российской империи: 1906—1917 / Б. Ю. Иванов, А. А. Комзолова, И. С. Ряховская. — Москва: РОССПЭН, 2008. — P. 371—372. — 735 p. — .
 Меөодіевъ (in Russian) // Члены Государственной думы (портреты и биографии): Четвертый созыв, 1912—1917 г. / сост. М. М. Боиович. — Москва: Тип. Т-ва И. Д. Сытина, 1913. — P. 1. — LXIV, 454, [2] p. 
 Овсянкин Е. И. Мефодиев Николай Владимирович (in Russian) // Поморская энциклопедия: в 5 т. / Адм. Арханг. обл. [и др.]. — Архангельск, 2001. — Vol. 1 : История Архангельского Севера. — P. 245 — 483 p. — .

References

1869 births
Date of death missing
People from the Republic of Karelia
People from Kemsky Uyezd
Russian Constitutional Democratic Party members
Members of the 3rd State Duma of the Russian Empire